Navegantes–Ministro Victor Konder International Airport  is the airport serving Navegantes, Brazil, as well as Itajaí, Balneário Camboriú, and Blumenau. It is named after the Itajaí-born Victor Konder (1886-1941), Minister of Public Works (1926-1930), whose administration encouraged the birth of Brazilian commercial aviation.

The airport is operated by CCR.

History
Previously operated by Infraero, on April 7, 2021 CCR won a 30-year concession to operate the airport.

Airlines and destinations

Access

See also

List of airports in Brazil

References

External links

Airports in Santa Catarina (state)